Quincy P. Hoffman (May 30, 1913 - December 12, 1994) was a Republican member of the Michigan House of Representatives, representing part of the Thumb from 1965 through 1980.

Born in 1913, Hoffman attended Michigan State University and graduated from the FBI's training school and Michigan Traffic Safety Center Enforcement School. He was president of the Village of Applegate as well as of the local school board, and was elected Sanilac County sheriff in 1954. Hoffman was elected to the House in 1964 and served eight terms.

Hoffman was director of the Michigan Sheriff's Association, a past commissioner in the Boy Scouts of America, and a Freemason.

References

Republican Party members of the Michigan House of Representatives
1913 births
1994 deaths
American Freemasons
Michigan sheriffs
People from Sanilac County, Michigan
20th-century American politicians